Kevin Gomes de Oliveira (born 24 June 1998) is an Indonesian professional footballer who plays as a left-back for Liga 1 club PSS Sleman.

Club career

Kalteng Putra
In the 2019 season, he joined Indonesian Liga 1 club, Kalteng Putra and made his debut against Persebaya Surabaya.

Borneo
In the 2020 season, he joined Indonesian Liga 1 club, Borneo and made his debut against Persija Jakarta. This season was suspended on 27 March 2020 due to the COVID-19 pandemic. The season was abandoned and was declared void on 20 January 2021.

Persita Tangerang
He was signed for Persita Tangerang to play in Liga 1 in the 2021 season. Kevin made his debut on 17 September 2021 in a match against Persela Lamongan at the Pakansari Stadium, Cibinong.

Persis Solo
Gomes was signed for Persis Solo to play in Liga 1 in the 2022–23 season.

PSS Sleman
On 23 January 2023, Kevin signed a contract with Liga 1 club PSS Sleman from Persis Solo. Kevin made his league debut for the club in a 2–0 win against Arema, coming on as a substituted Haris Tuharea.

Personal life

He is eligible to represent Brazil internationally through his father.

Career statistics

Club

Personal life
Kevin is the son of the legend of Persebaya Surabaya, Gomes de Oliveira.

References

External links
 Kevin Gomes at Soccerway
 Kevin Gomes at Liga Indonesia

Living people
1996 births
Sportspeople from Surabaya
Sportspeople from East Java
Indonesian footballers
Association football fullbacks
Liga 1 (Indonesia) players
Araxá Esporte Clube players
Borneo F.C. players
Kalteng Putra F.C. players
Persita Tangerang players
Persis Solo players
Indonesian people of Brazilian descent
Brazilian emigrants to Indonesia